Princess Béatrice Marie Caroline Louise Françoise of Bourbon-Two Sicilies (born 16 June 1950 in Saint-Raphaël, Var, France) is the eldest daughter of Prince Ferdinand, Duke of Castro, Castro-line claimant to the headship of the House of Bourbon-Two Sicilies, and his wife, Chantal de Chevron-Villette.

Her younger brother, Prince Carlo, Duke of Castro, is the current Castro-line claimant to the headship of the House of Bourbon-Two Sicilies. Since 2014,  Béatrice has served as Grand Chancellor of the Sacred Military Constantinian Order of Saint George.

Marriage and issue
Béatrice married Charles Napoléon Bonaparte, eldest son of Louis, Prince Napoléon and his wife, Alix de Foresta, on 19 December 1978 in Paris, France. Charles was the great-great-grand-nephew of Napoleon I of France, founder of the Imperial House of France. The couple divorced in 1989.

Béatrice and Charles had two children:

 Princess Caroline Marie Constance Napoléon (24 October 1980), married Eric Alain Marie Quérénet-Onfroy de Bréville (born 20 June 1971), son of François Quérénet-Onfroy de Bréville and his wife Christiane Vincent de Vaugelas, on 19 September 2009 in Castellabate nel Cilento, Italy:
 Elvire Quérénet-Onfroy de Breville (born 8 August 2010),
 Augustin Quérénet-Onfroy de Breville (born 12 February 2013)
 Prince Jean-Christophe Napoléon (11 July 1986), married Countess Olympia von und zu Arco-Zinneberg on 19 October 2019 in Paris.

Title, styles and honours

Title and styles
 Her Royal Highness Princess Béatrice of Bourbon-Two Sicilies

Honours
  House of Bourbon-Two Sicilies: Grand Chancellor Knight Grand Cross with Collar of Justice of the Two Sicilian Sacred Military Constantinian Order of Saint George
 : Knight Grand Cross of the Order of Merit

Ancestry

References

People from Var (department)
Princesses of Bourbon-Two Sicilies
1950 births
French people of Polish descent
Living people
French Roman Catholics
20th-century Roman Catholics
21st-century Roman Catholics
20th-century French people
20th-century French women
21st-century French people
21st-century French women
Recipients of the Order pro Merito Melitensi